Estrogen dominance (ED) is a theory about a metabolic state where the level of estrogen outweighs the level of progesterone in the body. This is said to be caused by a decrease in progesterone without a subsequent decrease in estrogen.

The theory was proposed by John R. Lee and Virginia Hopkins in their 1996 book, What Your Doctor May Not Tell You About Menopause: The Breakthrough Book on Natural Progesterone. In their book Lee and Hopkins assert that ED causes fatigue, depression, anxiety, low libido, weight gain specifically in the midsection, water retention, headaches, mood swings and white spots on fingernails  fibrocystic breasts. The book criticizes estrogen replacement therapy and proposes the use of "natural progesterone" for menopausal women in order to alleviate a variety of complaints.  Lee's theories have been criticized for being inadequately supported through science, being primarily based on anecdotal evidence with no rigorous research to support them.
Taking an artichoke supplement can decrease estrogen dominance. Artichoke cleanses the liver and most who struggle with estrogen dominance have a fatty liver or are at risk of having a fatty liver. Helping the liver detox the body, rids itself of excess estrogen allowing for hormonal balance. Estrogen dominance can affect both men and women.

Proponents 
Estrogen dominance is widely discussed by many proponents and on many alternative medicine websites, including:

Christiane Northrup, former obstetrics and gynaecology physician, believes that estrogen dominance is linked to "allergies, autoimmune disorders, breast cancer, uterine cancer, infertility, ovarian cysts, and increased blood clotting, and is also associated with acceleration of the aging process." She believes that ED can be reduced by several methods including taking multi-vitamins, using progesterone cream, decreasing stress and detoxifying the liver.

Nisha Chellam, an internal medicine and holistic and integrative health physician, admits that "estrogen dominance isn't an official medical diagnosis" but believes that it is "an under-diagnosed condition." The list of symptoms Chellam attributes to ED include "unexplained weight gain, difficulty losing weight, breast tenderness, subcutaneous fat, heavy periods, missing periods, prolonged cycles, painful periods, premenstrual dysmorphic disorder , infertility, mood swings, insomnia, headaches and migraines."

Bob Wood, R.Ph., lists the symptoms of estrogen dominance as "fibrocystic and tender breasts, heavy menstrual bleeding, irregular menstrual cycles, mood swings, vasomotor symptoms, weight gain and uterine fibroids" and believes that testing and "balancing hormones is of benefit to women of all ages".

Research 
Extensive research has been conducted on all aspects of estrogen including its mechanism of action, contraindications to estrogen supplementation and estrogen toxicity. Research on hormone replacement therapies have indicated that hormone replacement did not help prevent heart disease and it increased risk for some medical conditions. Research conducted by Alfred Plechner points to cortisol as a possible cause of naturally elevated estrogen. "The cortisol abnormality creates a domino effect on feedback loops involving the hypothalamus–pituitary–adrenal axis. In this scenario, estrogen becomes elevated..."

References

Alternative medicine
Naturopathy
Sex hormones